Rim Kun-u (born 11 February 1981) is a North Korean former footballer. He represented North Korea on at least thirteen occasions between 2000 and 2003.

Career statistics

International

References

1981 births
Living people
North Korean footballers
North Korea international footballers
Association football midfielders